Ipta or IPTA can refer to:

 Indian People's Theatre Association
 International Pulsar Timing Array
 Werner Ipta, German football player